The Fate of a Night (German: Das Schicksal einer Nacht) is a 1927 German silent film directed by Erich Schönfelder.

The film's art direction was by Ernst Stern.

Cast
In alphabetical order
Jean Bradin 
Edda Croy
Hans Junkermann
Alice Kempen
Harry Liedtke
Erna Morena
Paul Otto
Albert Paulig
Adele Sandrock
Hermine Sterler

References

External links

Films based on works by Stefan Zweig
Films of the Weimar Republic
Films directed by Erich Schönfelder
German silent feature films
German black-and-white films
Terra Film films